Christian Kaufmann (born 9 September 1976) is a Swiss freestyle skier. He competed in the men's aerials event at the 2002 Winter Olympics.

References

1976 births
Living people
Swiss male freestyle skiers
Olympic freestyle skiers of Switzerland
Freestyle skiers at the 2002 Winter Olympics